Thomas Patrick Bussey (1905-1981) was an associate justice of the South Carolina Supreme Court.

Biography
Justice Bussey was twice a representative in the South Carolina House of Representatives (from 1937 to 1940 and then again in 1957 to 1958). He was elected to be a trial court judge in January 1958 and then reelected in 1961 for a full term. He was elevated to the South Carolina Supreme Court in February 1961 to fill the position being vacated by the retirement of Lionel K. Legge in December 1961. He was sworn in on December 11, 1961. He served on the supreme court until he retired on September 30, 1975. 

Justice Bussey died on July 26, 1981, and is buried at Biggin Cemetery in Moncks Corner, South Carolina.

References

Justices of the South Carolina Supreme Court
People from McCormick County, South Carolina
1905 births
1981 deaths
20th-century American judges